Paraguay competed at the 2012 Summer Olympics in London, from 27 July to 12 August 2012. This was the nation's eleventh appearance at the Olympics, except the 1980 Summer Olympics in Moscow because of its partial support to the United States boycott.

Comité Olímpico Paraguayo sent a total of 8 athletes, an equal share between men and women, to compete in 6 sports. Javelin thrower Leryn Franco, who competed at her third Olympics, was considered one of the most beautiful women in these Olympic Games, because of her professional career as a model and a beauty pageant contestant. Freestyle swimmer Benjamin Hockin, who played for Great Britain in Beijing, and embraced British roots to represent his mother's home land, became the nation's flag bearer at the opening ceremony. Paraguay, however, failed to win a single Olympic medal in London, since the 2004 Summer Olympics in Athens, where the men's football team won the silver.

Athletics

Paraguayan athletes have so far achieved qualifying standards in the following athletics events (up to a maximum of 3 athletes in each event at the 'A' Standard, and 1 at the 'B' Standard):

Key
 Note – Ranks given for track events are within the athlete's heat only
 Q = Qualified for the next round
 q = Qualified for the next round as a fastest loser or, in field events, by position without achieving the qualifying target
 NR = National record
 N/A = Round not applicable for the event
 Bye = Athlete not required to compete in round

Men

Women

Judo

Rowing

Paraguay has qualified the following boat by invitation.

Women

Qualification Legend: FA=Final A (medal); FB=Final B (non-medal); FC=Final C (non-medal); FD=Final D (non-medal); FE=Final E (non-medal); FF=Final F (non-medal); SA/B=Semifinals A/B; SC/D=Semifinals C/D; SE/F=Semifinals E/F; QF=Quarterfinals; R=Repechage

Swimming

Paraguayan swimmers have so far achieved qualifying standards in the following events (up to a maximum of 2 swimmers in each event at the Olympic Qualifying Time (OQT), and 1 at the Olympic Selection Time (OST)):

Men

Women

Table tennis

Paraguay has so far qualified one table tennis player.

Tennis

See also
Paraguay at the 2011 Pan American Games

References

Summer Olympics
Nations at the 2012 Summer Olympics
2012